The 2018 Women's LEN Super Cup was the 13th edition of the annual trophy organised by LEN and contested by the reigning champions of the two European competitions for women's water polo clubs. The match was played between Kinef Kirishi (2017–18 Euro League champions) and Dunaújvárosi FVE (winners of the 2017–18 LEN Trophy) at the Neftyanik Sports Complex in Kirishi, Russia, on 10 November 2018.

Hungary's Dunaújváros, at their debut in the competition, won the trophy recovering from a 4-goal gap during the last quarter and defeating after the shootouts the European champions and Super Cup title holders of Kinef at their home pool in Kirishi.

Teams

Squads

Head coach: Aleksandr Kabanov

Head coach: Attila Mihók

Match

See also
2018 LEN Super Cup

References

External links
 Official LEN website
 Microplustiming.com (official results website)

Women's LEN Super Cup
S
L
L